Oluwatobiloba Oluwayemi (born 8 May 2003) is an English professional footballer who plays as a goalkeeper for League of Ireland Premier Division club Cork City, on loan from Scottish Premiership club Celtic.

Club career

Born and raised in London to parents of Nigerian descent, Oluwayemi spent the first part of his youth career at Tottenham Hotspur's academy, before joining Celtic in July 2019, as he signed a three-year professional contract with the Scottish club.

After progressing through the youth ranks, in the first half of 2021 Oluwayemi started training with Celtic's first team, first under manager Neil Lennon and then, after his sacking, John Kennedy. In June of the same year, the goalkeeper renewed his contract with the club until June 2024.

During the 2021–22 season, following the appointment of Ange Postecoglou as Celtic's new manager, Oluwayemi effectively became the club's third-choice goalkeeper, behind Joe Hart and Scott Bain, being included in several match-day squads for UEFA Europa League and UEFA Europa Conference League games. He kept working in the first-team environment throughout the following campaign, as well, while keeping featuring both in the Lowland Football League (where he played for Celtic's B Team) and the UEFA Youth League.

On 13 January 2023, Oluwayemi joined newly-promoted Irish side Cork City on loan until the end of June. He went on to make his professional debut on 17 February, starting and playing 90 minutes in Cork's first league game of the season, a 1–2 home defeat to Bohemian.

International career
Thanks to his dual citizenship, Oluwayemi is eligible to represent either England or Nigeria internationally.

He has been a youth international for England, having played for all their set-ups from the under-15 to the under-20 national team.

Style of play 
Oluwayemi has been described as a strong and composed goalkeeper, who is mainly regarded for his shot-stopping abilities and his leadership, as well as his distribution. During his youth career, he originally played outfield before establishing himself in goal.

Personal life 
He has an older brother, Josh (b. 2001), who is also a goalkeeper: he similarly played for Tottenham's youth academy and represented England at several youth international levels.

Career statistics

Club

References

External links 

 
 
 
 
 

2003 births
Living people
People from London
English people of Nigerian descent
Sportspeople from London
Footballers from Greater London
English footballers
Black British sportspeople
Association football goalkeepers
England youth international footballers
Tottenham Hotspur F.C. players
Celtic F.C. players
Cork City F.C. players
English expatriate footballers
Expatriate association footballers in Ireland
English expatriate sportspeople in Ireland